Millie is a small locality in Moree Plains Shire, in northern New South Wales, Australia. It lies about 45 km southwest of Moree and 600 km northwest of Sydney. According to William Ridley, "Millie" was a Kamilaroi name of meaning "white pipe clay" or "silicate of magnesia" (talc). Another 1901 source suggested it came from an Australian Aboriginal word "Mil" meaning "eye".

References

Moree Plains Shire
North West Slopes
Localities in New South Wales